The House of Clasci or House of Klašić was a noble family from the city of Dubrovnik and the Republic of Ragusa. They belonged to the list of late patriciate families of the Ragusan nobility.

See also
 Dubrovnik
 Republic of Ragusa
 Dalmatia

References

Ragusan noble families